Reto Götschi (born 25 December 1965, in Hausen am Albis) is a Swiss bobsledder who competed in the 1990s. He won a silver medal in the two-man event with teammate Guido Acklin at the 1994 Winter Olympics in Lillehammer.

Götschi also won a complete set of medals in the two-man event at the FIBT World Championships with a gold in 1997, a silver in 2001, and a bronze in 1996.

His best finish in the Bobsleigh World Cup was second four times (Combined men's: 199495, 199899; Two-man: 199495, 199899).

References
 Bobsleigh two-man Olympic medalists 1932-56 and since 1964
 Bobsleigh two-man world championship medalists since 1931
 DatabaseOlympics.com profile
 List of combined men's bobsleigh World Cup champions: 1985-2007
 List of two-man bobsleigh World Cup champions since 1985

1965 births
Bobsledders at the 1994 Winter Olympics
Bobsledders at the 1998 Winter Olympics
Living people
Olympic silver medalists for Switzerland
Olympic bobsledders of Switzerland
Swiss male bobsledders
Olympic medalists in bobsleigh
Medalists at the 1994 Winter Olympics
20th-century Swiss people